This a list of people who have served as Mayor of the US city of Rutland, Vermont, since its incorporation as a city on November 19, 1892.

References

External links
City of Rutland, Vermont

Mayors
Rutland